Sphingomonas sanxanigenens  is a Gram-negative, non-spore-forming and rod-shaped bacteria from the genus of Sphingomonas which has been isolated from soil from a cornfield from Xinhe County in China.

References

Further reading

External links
Type strain of Sphingomonas sanxanigenens at BacDive -  the Bacterial Diversity Metadatabase	

sanxanigenens
Bacteria described in 2009